Saint-Maurice-d'Ibie is a commune in the Ardèche department in southern France.

Geography
The village lies in the north-western part of the commune, on the left bank of the river Ibie.

Population

See also
Communes of the Ardèche department

References

Communes of Ardèche
Ardèche communes articles needing translation from French Wikipedia